This is a list of career statistics of Russian tennis player Anastasia Pavlyuchenkova. To date, Pavlyuchenkova has won 12 WTA singles titles (finishing runner-up in nine other finals) and six WTA doubles titles (including two WTA 1000 titles), as well as five ITF singles titles and eight ITF doubles titles. She has reached one Grand Slam singles final at the 2021 French Open, as well as an additional 12 Grand Slam quarterfinals (six apiece in both singles and doubles) across all four major tournaments.

Performance timelines

Only main-draw results in WTA Tour, Grand Slam tournaments, Fed Cup/Billie Jean King Cup and Olympic Games are included in win–loss records.

Singles
Current after the 2023 Dubai Open.

Doubles
Current after the 2023 Australian Open.

Significant finals

Grand Slam tournament finals

Singles: 1 (runner-up)

Olympic finals

Mixed doubles: 1 (gold medal)

WTA 1000 finals

Doubles: 2 (2 titles)

WTA career finals

Singles: 21 (12 titles, 9 runner-ups)

Doubles: 10 (6 titles, 4 runner-ups)

ITF Circuit finals

Singles: 6 (5 titles, 1 runner-up)

Doubles: 10 (8 titles, 2 runner-ups)

WTA rankings

*as of 6 June 2022.

WTA Tour career earnings
as of 15 November 2021

Grand Slam tournament seedings

Tennis Leagues

League finals: 1 (first place)

Fed Cup participation

Singles: 18 (9–9)

Doubles: 7 (5–2)

Head-to-head records

Record against top 10 players
Pavlyuchenkova's record against certain players who have been ranked in the top 10 are as follows. Active players are in boldface:

No. 1 wins

Top 10 wins

Notes

References

External links
 
 
 

Pavlyuchenkova, Anastasia